Lied für NRW or Hier an Rhein und Ruhr und in Westfalen is, since the 60th anniversary celebrations of North Rhine-Westphalia, a non-official regional anthem of this German Bundesland. There are many local anthems of certain regions of North Rhine-Westphalia, but there had not yet been an anthem for the entire state.

History 

The anthem was a gift of the regional broadcasting station Westdeutscher Rundfunk to the federal state of North Rhine-Westphalia on its 60th anniversary. It was presented to the public on 27 August 2006, the official anniversary date, at Düsseldorf, the state's capital.

Copyright 

The lyrics were created by Hans Knipp and the Bläck Fööss band, and the melody was composed by Dietmar Mensinger, Hanno Beckers and the Bläck Fööss band. It was published by the Bläck-Fööss Verlag.

Lyrics 

Unser Land lag verbrannt in den Wunden, 
die der Krieg geschlagen. 
Doch mit Herz und Verstand 
nahmst du dein Schicksal selber in die Hand. 
Erschaffen aus Ruinen, 
als man die Hoffnung endlich wiederfand. 
Hier an Rhein und Ruhr und in Westfalen; 
Alaaf, Helau, Glückauf für unser Land!

Refrain:
Hier an Rhein und Ruhr und in Westfalen, 
an Sieg und Ems,
im Lipperland, 
hier an Rhein und Ruhr und in Westfalen, 
schlägt unser Herz, lebt unser Land!

Neue Heimat, neues Glück, 
viele haben’s hier bei dir gefunden. 
Bauten auf die Zukunft Stück für Stück, 
warf es sie auch schon manchesmal zurück. 
Auf dem bunten Marktplatz der Kulturen, 
da ist das Leben, da hat jeder seinen Stand.  
Hier an Rhein und Ruhr und in Westfalen; 
Kölsch, Alt und Pils, gemeinsam Hand in Hand!

Hier an Rhein und Ruhr und in Westfalen, 
an Sieg und Ems, 
im Lipperland, 
hier an Rhein und Ruhr und in Westfalen, 
schlägt unser Herz, lebt unser Land!

External links 

German songs
North Rhine-Westphalia
2006 songs